The 1978–79 Midland Football Combination season was the 42nd in the history of Midland Football Combination, a football competition in England.

Division One

Division One featured 19 clubs which competed in the division last season along with one new club, promoted from Division Two:
Walsall Wood

League table

References

1978–79
M